is a Japanese ichthyologist specializing in elasmobranchs, especially sharks. He graduated from Hokkaido University's Laboratory of Marine Zoology with a PhD in Fisheries Science. He is an editor of Japan's Ichthyological Research journal and author of the book, Squalean Phylogeny. He died at the age of 63 on September 9, 2020.

Taxon described by him
See :Category:Taxa named by Shigeru Shirai

References 
4. 白井　滋さんを偲んで. Japanese Society for Elasmobranch Studies. Vol.53. March 2021.

Japanese ichthyologists
Japanese scientists
Living people
Year of birth missing (living people)